The Easter Island moray (Gymnothorax nasuta) is a moray eel found in the southeast Pacific Ocean, around Easter Island and Chile. It was first named by de Buen in 1961.

References

nasuta
Taxa named by Fernando de Buen y Lozano
Fish described in 1961